American singer-songwriter Bruno Mars has released one concert video and appeared in various music videos, films, television shows, and commercials. After guest appearing in music videos, including "Long Distance" by Brandy and "Wavin' Flag (Coca-Cola Celebration Mix)" by K'naan, between 2008 and 2010, he was first featured on the chorus and videos for B.o.B.'s "Nothin' on You" and Travie McCoy's "Billionaire". A home video for "The Other Side" was issued, introducing Mars as a lead artist. From his debut album Doo-Wops & Hooligans (2010), he released music videos for "Just the Way You Are", "Grenade", "Liquor Store Blues", and "The Lazy Song". In 2011, he received various awards for the "Just the Way You Are" music video, including MTV Video Music Award Japan for Best Male Video and Favorite International Video at the Myx Music Awards.

Mars followed with three other music videos in 2011, including "It Will Rain" from the soundtrack of The Twilight Saga: Breaking Dawn – Part 1, which won another Best Male Video award at the MTV Video Music Award Japan. In 2012, Mars's music video for "Locked Out of Heaven", from his second album Unorthodox Jukebox (2012), won Best Male Video at the 2013 MTV Video Music Awards. In 2013, videos for the singles "When I Was Your Man", "Treasure", which won Best Choreography at the latter event, and "Gorilla", which was controversial for its provocative dancing, were released. In 2015, the music video for Mark Ronson's single "Uptown Funk", which featured Mars, received several awards, including Video of the Year at the Soul Train Music Awards and Best Pop Video-UK at the UK Music Video Awards.

In 2016, Mars released his third album, 24K Magic, which spawned music videos for "24K Magic", "That's What I Like", "Versace on the Floor", and "Finesse" featuring Cardi B. The video for "That's What I Like" won several accolades in 2017, including an American Music Award for Video of the Year and Outstanding Music Video at the NAACP Image Awards. In the same year, the video for "24K Magic" received an award for Video of the Year at the BET Awards, as well as an accolade for Best Dance Performance and Video of the Year at the Soul Train Music Awards. The music video for "Finesse" was awarded Video of the Year at the 2018 Soul Train Music Awards and Best Music Video at the 2019 iHeartRadio Music Awards. 

In 2021, Mars released a collaborative album with Anderson .Paak, as Silk Sonic, called An Evening with Silk Sonic, which generated videos for "Leave the Door Open", "Skate" and "Smokin out the Window". The former music video won Best R&B and Best Editing at the 2021 MTV Video Music Awards, as well as Video of the Year at the 2021 Soul Train Music Awards. "Smokin out the Window" won Video of the Year at the BET Awards 2022 and Video of the Year at the 2022 Soul Train Music Awards.

Mars directed ten videos with Cameron Duddy, which earned them recognition at several award shows, including nominations for MTV Video Music Award for Best Direction on "Uptown Funk" and "24K Magic". The artist also directed six videos with Florent Dechard. Their work earned them an award for Video Director of the Year at the BET Awards 2021. Mars and Ben Winston's direction of Bruno Mars: 24K Magic Live at the Apollo (2017) earned them a nomination for a Primetime Emmy Award for Outstanding Music Direction.  Mars has won five times Video of the Year at the Soul Train Music Awards. In addition to his music videos, Mars has starred in the movie Honeymoon in Vegas (1992) as Little Elvis and in Rio 2 (2014) as the voice of Roberto. Mars has additionally starred in television shows, including Sesame Street (2011) and Jane the Virgin (2016). He has also appeared in commercials for the clothing brand Bench, Vogue and Selvarey Rum.

Music videos

Guest appearances

Concert film and live/video album

Filmography

Television

Commercials

Notes

References

Videography
Videographies of American artists